Sara Sidner (born May 31, 1972) is an American journalist. She is a correspondent for CNN and CNN International based at CNN's Los Angeles bureau. She also anchored Big Picture with Sara Sidner on CNN+, the network's shortlived subscription service.

Early life
A native of Miami Lakes, Florida, Sidner was born to an African-American father and a British mother. She graduated from Hialeah-Miami Lakes High School and the University of Florida with a telecommunications degree. While a student at the university, she played on the women's volleyball team, which made the Final Four during her last year.

Career
Sidner began her on-air reporting career at WUFT-TV in Gainesville, Florida. This was followed by periods at KFVS-TV in Cape Girardeau, Missouri, WINK-TV in Fort Myers, Florida, and KDFW-TV in Dallas, Texas. At KDFW, she spent three years as a consumer reporter/anchor.  She also distinguished herself by reporting on the Space Shuttle Columbia disaster. In January 2004, Sidner joined KTVU in Oakland, California, where she served as a weekend co-anchor of KTVU Channel 2 News at 6 and The Ten O’Clock News. She also served as a weekday reporter for the station.

Sidner has received many journalism awards. These include a Regional Emmy Award, a Lone Star Award, and several Associated Press Awards.

CNN
Currently, Sidner is a national and international correspondent for CNN, based in Los Angeles. She has previously been based in Jerusalem, Abu Dhabi, and New Delhi. At CNN, Sidner has reported on a wide range of subjects including the 2011 Libyan civil war, the launching of India's first unmanned lunar probe, and the Mumbai terrorist attacks.

On Sunday May 31, 2020, while in Minneapolis covering the protests sparked by the murder of George Floyd by police officer Derek Chauvin, Sidner conducted a newsmaking live interview with the city's police chief, Medaria Arradondo, in which Arradondo expressed his opinion that the three other officers who were present during the murder also bore responsibility.

In January 2023, CNN announced plans to revamp its daytime programming, Sidner will co-anchor with John Berman and Kate Bolduan from 9 a.m. until noon on their new program in Spring 2023.

References

External links 
 
 

1972 births
Living people
American expatriates in the United Arab Emirates
American expatriates in India
American expatriates in Israel
African-American women journalists
African-American journalists
American women television journalists
American television news anchors
American television reporters and correspondents
University of Florida College of Journalism and Communications alumni
People from Miami Lakes, Florida
CNN people
American people of British descent
African-American television personalities
Florida Gators women's volleyball players
21st-century African-American people
21st-century African-American women
20th-century African-American people
20th-century African-American women